Nedyalkov (Cyrillic: Недялков) is a Slavic masculine surname, its feminine counterpart is Nedyalkova. It may refer to
Anton Nedyalkov (born 1993), Bulgarian footballer 
Georgi Nedyalkov (born 1989), Bulgarian footballer
 Anjela Nedyalkova, (born 1991), Bulgarian actress

Bulgarian-language surnames